Black bottom pie is a type of pie originating in the United States that features a layer of chocolate pastry cream or pudding, the "black bottom", topped with whipped cream or meringue. The single crust is pre-baked and of variable composition, but a graham cracker crust is common.

Origin
Black bottom pie is thought by some to be of Southern origin, the "black bottom" representing the dark, swampy lowlands along the Mississippi River; other sources have identified an origin in Louisiana or Oklahoma City in the early 1940s. Its invention has been claimed by Monroe Boston Strause of Los Angeles.  Strause, who was known as the "Pie King", was the inventor of the chiffon pie and the graham cracker crust.

See also
 List of pies, tarts and flans

References

American pies
Sweet pies
Chocolate desserts